Tendai Passion Ndoro (born 15 May 1988) is a Zimbabwean footballer who plays as a centre forward.

Club career
Ndoro started his career with Chicken Inn of Zimbabwe in 2011. Two years later, Ndoro completed a move to South African club Black Aces but was immediately returned to Chicken Inn on loan for the rest of the 2013 season. In 2014, he officially joined the Black Aces squad and subsequently made 41 appearances and scored 14 goals over two seasons before departing in 2015 to join Orlando Pirates.

In the 2017–18 season he appeared for three clubs - Orlando Pirates, Al Faisaly, and Ajax Cape Town, in breach of FIFA regulations. As a result, Ajax Cape Town had to forfeit the three league games he had appeared in for them, resulting in their relegation from the South African Premier League.

On 26 September, Ndoro signed for Highlands Park. 

On 27 December 2019, Al-Orouba from Oman announced that they had signed Ndoro. Ndoro played for the club less than a season in 2020 before the club went bankrupt and closed. Following this sting, Ndoro became ill and was close to a mental breakdown. But in August 2022, he revealed, that he was ready to continue his career.

Career statistics

Club
.

International
.

International goals
. Scores and results list Zimbabwe's goal tally first.

References

External links

1985 births
Living people
Association football forwards
Zimbabwean footballers
Chicken Inn F.C. players
Orlando Pirates F.C. players
Mpumalanga Black Aces F.C. players
Cape Town Spurs F.C. players
Highlands Park F.C. players
Al-Orouba SC players
2017 Africa Cup of Nations players
Zimbabwe international footballers
Zimbabwean expatriate footballers
Zimbabwean expatriate sportspeople in South Africa
Expatriate soccer players in South Africa
Expatriate footballers in Saudi Arabia
Zimbabwean expatriate sportspeople in Saudi Arabia
Expatriate footballers in Oman
Zimbabwean expatriate sportspeople in Oman
Saudi Professional League players
Al-Faisaly FC players